The 2007–08 CEV Champions League was the 49th edition of the highest level European volleyball club competition organised by the European Volleyball Confederation.

Participating teams

League round
24 teams will be drawn to 6 pools of 4 teams each.
The 1st – 2nd ranked will qualify for the Play-off 12 teams.
If the organizer of the final four is one of the above qualified teams in this case this team directly qualifies
for the final four and the 3rd ranked team with the best score will also qualify for the Play-off 12 teams
(replaces the organizer of the Final Four Tournament). The four next 3rd ranked teams with the best score
will qualify for the Challenge Round of the CEV CUP. The remaining 3rd ranked teams and the 4th ranked
teams are eliminated.

Pool A

|}

Pool B

|}

Pool C

|}

Pool D

|}

Pool E

|}

Pool F

|}

Playoffs

Playoff 12

|}

First leg

|}

Second leg

|}

Playoff 6

|}

First leg

|}

Second leg

|}

Final Four
Organizer:  PGE Skra Bełchatów
 Place: Łódź
All times on 29 March are Central European Time (UTC+01:00) and all times on 30 March are Central European Summer Time (UTC+02:00).

Semifinals

|}

3rd place match

|}

Final

|}

Final standings

Awards

Most Valuable Player
  Clayton Stanley (Dynamo Tattransgaz Kazan)
Best Scorer
  Hristo Zlatanov (Copra Piacenza)
Best Spiker
  Mariusz Wlazły (PGE Skra Bełchatów)
Best Server
  João Paulo Bravo (Copra Piacenza)

Best Blocker
  Aleksandr Bogomolov (Dynamo Tattransgaz Kazan)
Best Receiver
  Alessandro Farina (Sisley Treviso)
Best Libero
  Sérgio Santos (Copra Piacenza)
Best Setter
  Marco Meoni (Copra Piacenza)

External links
 2007/08 European Champions League

CEV Champions League
2007 in volleyball
2008 in volleyball